The Bailiff of Sarum or Bailiff of New Sarum was an official appointed by the Bishop of Salisbury in the 14th and 15th centuries.

Bishop's Bailiff of New Sarum (Salisbury) 
The Office of Bishop's bailiff was appointed directly from the Bishop of Salisbury. The appointee was paid whilst in office. The Office of Bailiff of New Sarum appears to centre on a legal function associated with the Church Courts in Salisbury diocese where jurisdiction of the bailiff was derived within the "lands, fiefs, and men of the bishop and his successors or of the dean, the canons, and their successors".

A document dated March 23, 1227, whereby King Henry III of England granted financial privileges to Bishop Richard Poore and his subsequent successors sheds light on the responsibilities of the Bailiff of New Sarum. Within this document it is found that the King "...conceded afterwards to the aforesaid bishop and his successors that no viscount or constable or any other of our bailiffs shall have power over or the right to enter into the lands, fiefs, and men of the bishop and his successors or of the dean, the canons, and their successors, but it [power and entrance] shall pertain wholly to the bishop and his successors and to their bailiffs, with the exception of those legal attachments from the pleas of the crown."

In the case of Sir Thomas Hungerford he also had the role of steward of the city of Salisbury and the manors of Milford and Woodford. A function described as a medieval demesne manager on behalf of the Bishop of Salisbury. It is unclear whether other incumbents had similar responsibilities.

Known incumbents of the Office of Bishop's Bailiff of New Sarum 
Dates shown below relate to dates as they appear on documents contained within the national archive whilst the incumbent is in office. Only the dates corresponding to Sir Thomas de Hungerford relate to full term served in office. Robert Longe shown below may be Robert Long of South Wraxall.

External links 
 The National Archives

References 

History of Salisbury